Virginia's 84th House of Delegates district elects one of 100 seats in the Virginia House of Delegates, the lower house of the state's bicameral legislature. District 84 represents part of Virginia Beach. The seat is currently held by Republican Glenn R. Davis Jr.

District officeholders

References

Virginia House of Delegates districts
Virginia Beach, Virginia